Dual oxidase 2, also known as DUOX2 or ThOX2 (for thyroid oxidase), is an enzyme that in humans is encoded by the DUOX2 gene. Dual oxidase is an enzyme that was first identified in the mammalian thyroid gland. In humans, two isoforms are found; hDUOX1 and hDUOX2 (this enzyme). The protein location is not exclusive to thyroid tissue; hDUOX1 is prominent in airway epithelial cells and hDUOX2 in the salivary glands and gastrointestinal tract.

Function 

Investigations into reactive oxygen species (ROS) in biological systems have, until recently, focused on characterization of phagocytic cell processes. It is now well accepted that production of such species is not restricted to phagocytic cells and can occur in eukaryotic non-phagocytic cell types via NADPH oxidase (NOX) or dual oxidase (DUOX). This new family of proteins, termed the NOX/DUOX family or NOX family of NADPH oxidases, consists of homologs to the catalytic moiety of phagocytic NADPH-oxidase, gp91phox. Members of the NOX/DUOX family have been found throughout eukaryotic species, including invertebrates, insects, nematodes, fungi, amoeba, algae, and plants (not found in prokaryotes). These enzymes clearly demonstrate regulated production of ROS as their sole function. Genetic analyses have implicated NOX/DUOX derived ROS in biological roles and pathological conditions including hypertension (NOX1), innate immunity (NOX2/DUOX), otoconia formation in the inner ear (NOX3) and thyroid hormone biosynthesis (DUOX1/2).DUOX2 is the isoform that generates H2O2 utilized by thyroid peroxidase (TPO) for the biosynthesis of thyroid hormones, supported by the discovery of congenital hypothyroidism resultant from an inactivating mutation in the DUOX2 gene.

The family currently has seven members including NOX1, NOX2 (formerly known as gp91phox), NOX3, NOX4, NOX5, DUOX1 and DUOX2.

This protein is known as a dual oxidase because it has both a peroxidase homology domain and a gp91phox domain.

Duox are also implicated in lung defence system and especially in cystic fibrosis.

Schema of duox implication in human lung defence system

References

Further reading 

 
 
 
 
 
 
 
 
 
 
 
 
 
 
 
 
 
 
 

EF-hand-containing proteins